Lucerne was a commercial schooner. In November 1886, she sank due to bad weather in Lake Superior, off Long Island in Chequamegon Bay. The site of the wreck was added to the National Register of Historic Places in 1991.

History
Lucerne was launched on April 23, 1873.

On November 15, 1886, Lucerne was loaded with 1,200 tons of iron ore at her home port, Ashland, Wisconsin. The load was consigned to Little, Oglebay and Company of Cleveland, Ohio. After the delivery, the captain and crew began a voyage back to Ashland. With new canvas sails and a light wind blowing, all the signs pointed to a speedy voyage home. However, a November snowstorm on the lake began developing that night.

On November 17 or 18, 1886, Lucerne succumbed to the violent storm, and sank off Long Island. At the height of the storm, the captain of the ship Fred Kelly had sighted Lucerne, but Fred Kelly unfortunately could not offer any help to the distressed ship under the circumstances. Nobody witnessed Lucernes final minutes, and none of the crew survived.

William Mack, part owner of Lucerne, became worried when the ship never arrived back Ashland. He telegraphed Bayfield, Wisconsin, and asked for a search vessel to be sent. The boat S. B. Barker was dispatched for the purpose, but did not have to go far to find the wreckage of Lucerne. The S. B. Barker′s crew discovered three masts sticking out of the water. Upon closer inspection, they saw three of the ship's crew members there, frozen solid in three inches (76 mm) of ice. Apparently they had climbed to the top of the masts to escape the freezing waters of Lake Superior and had perished there while waiting to be rescued. The three bodies were moved to Bayfield.

See also
Lucerne (disambiguation)
Apostle Islands
List of shipwrecks in the Great Lakes

References

1873 ships
Maritime incidents in November 1886
Shipwrecks of the Wisconsin coast
Shipwrecks on the National Register of Historic Places in Wisconsin

Shipwrecks of Lake Superior
Ships lost with all hands
Apostle Islands
National Register of Historic Places in Ashland County, Wisconsin